The USS Firefly, was a brig with two masts, square-rigged, formerly named Volant and originally built as a schooner for use as a privateer. The U.S. Navy purchased Volant on 8 December 1814 at New York by and was fitted her out as US naval 14-gun brig. She served during the War of 1812 and Second Barbary War of 1815. Firefly was purchased because of the several US blockade efforts where smaller ships with better maneuverability were needed for the task. The Navy sold her in 1816 and she became a Portuguese slave ship.

History

In 1814, during the War of 1812, Firefly became the flagship of a squadron of five small ships which, under the command of Captain David Porter, were preparing for a mission to the West Indies to capture or destroy enemy commerce. However the mission was canceled when a peace treaty with Britain was signed on 24 December.

On 20 May 1815, during the Second Barbary War, command of the Firefly was given to Lieutenant George W. Rodgers who departed from New York for the Mediterranean to join the squadron of Commodore Stephen Decatur. After a few days at sea Rodgers' squadron encountered a heavy gale and Firefly sprung a mast, forcing her to return to port for repairs.

After repairs were completed Firefly set sail again for the Mediterranean on 18 July where she joined Commodore William Bainbridge's and Decatur's squadrons at Carthagena where preparations for the mission at Algiers were being made. From there the squadrons sailed to Algiers and spend the next several months maintaining the blockade and enforcing the peace concluded with the Dey of Algiers by Commodore Decatur and William Shaler, US Consul to Algiers.

On 15 November 1815 Firefly arrived with the squadron at Newport, R.I., then sailed on to New York where she was laid up at the navy yard. She was sold at public auction on 3 April 1816 at New York.

She apparently became the slaver Africano, or San Francisco de Paula.

See also
List of schooners
Piracy in the Caribbean
West Indies Anti-Piracy Operations of the United States

Citations

Further reading
 E'Book
 Book
 Book
 E'Book
 Book

Brigs of the United States Navy
War of 1812 ships of the United States
1810s ships